The Finnish Evangelical Lutheran Church of America (commonly known as the Suomi Synod) was a Lutheran church body which existed in the United States from 1890 until 1962.

History

The Finnish Evangelical Lutheran Church of America  (FELC) was organized at Calumet, Michigan in 1890. FELC was defined more by its Finnish ethnic origin than by any specific theological strain. In 1896, the church established Suomi College and Theological Seminary (now called Finlandia University) in Hancock, Michigan. It is the only private institution of higher learning in Michigan's Upper Peninsula and the only remaining university in North America founded by Finnish immigrants.

FELC was one of the Lutheran church bodies that merged into the Lutheran Church in America (LCA) in 1962. At that time, FELC had 36,274 members and 105 ministers in 153 congregations, and was the smallest of LCA's founding church bodies. The LCA was subsequently party to the merger that created the Evangelical Lutheran Church in America in 1988.

Presidents
Juho K. Nikander (1890–1898)
Kaarle Leonard Tolonen (1898–1902) 
Juho K. Nikander (1902–1919)
John Wargelin  (1919–1919)
Alvar Albert Rautalahti (1919–1922)
Alfred Haapanen (1922–1950) 
John Wargelin (1950–1955)
Raymond Waldemar Wargelin (1955–1962)

See also
National Evangelical Lutheran Church
Apostolic Lutheran Church of America

References

Other sources
 Wolf, Edmund Jacob (1889) The Lutherans in America; a story of struggle, progress, influence and marvelous growth (New York: J.A. Hill)
 Bente, F. (1919) American Lutheranism Volume II (St. Louis: Concordia Publishing House) 
 Nichol, Todd W. (1986) All These Lutherans (Minneapolis: Augsburg Publishers)

External links
Haapanen, Alfred (1949)  Our Church. Suomi Synod. The Finnish Evangelical Lutheran Church of America  (Hancock, Michigan: Finnish Lutheran Book Concern)

Evangelical Lutheran Church in America predecessor churches
Lutheran denominations established in the 19th century
Religious organizations established in 1890
Lutheran denominations in North America
Finnish-American history
Finnish-American culture in Michigan